The Woman Who Sinned is a 1991 American television film directed by Michael Switzer and starring Susan Lucci and Tim Matheson. 
It was later released in 1992 by Genesis Home Video (UK) as a home video titled Mortal Passion (run time 90 minutes).

Plot
Victoria Robeson (Lucci) and her husband Michael (Matheson) are an apparently happily married couple. However Victoria becomes involved in an adulterous affair with Evan Ganns (Dudikoff) who later kills her friend Jane Woodman. Victoria is falsely accused of the murder and is forced to reveal details of her affair to prove her innocence.

Cast
 Susan Lucci as Victoria Robeson
 Tim Matheson as Michael Robeson
 Michael Dudikoff as Evan Ganns
 John Vernon as Lt. Girvetz, police lieutenant in charge of the murder investigation
 Clayton Landey as Larry 
 Christina Belford as Randy Emerson, a private detective
 Lenore Kasdorf as Jane Woodman
 Tom Everett as a police sergeant
 Dick Miller as Thomas, a police detective
 Claudia Christian as Judy Reinhardt

Reception
The film received negative reviews. According to Joanna Berry in the Radio Times (on line), "More time seems to have been spent on Lucci's wardrobe and hairdo than on the plot" and Hal Erickson at AllMovie wrote that the film was a "melodramatic farrago" for which "the publicity people did their best to suggest that The Woman Who Sinned was reminiscent of Fatal Attraction, simply because both films involved a clandestine love affair and a psycho killer".

References

External links
 
 
 
 The Woman Who Sinned at The Movie Scene

1991 television films
1991 films
American television films
Films directed by Michael Switzer